The Ozan Formation is a geologic formation in Arkansas, Oklahoma and Texas. It preserves fossils dating back to the Cretaceous period.

Paleofauna

Ostracods

Alatacythere
A. ponderosana
Amphicytherur
A. dubia
Bairdoppilata
B. rotunda
Brachycythere
B. ledaforma
B. rhomboidalis
B. sphenoides
Bythocypris
B. windhami
Clithrocytheridea
C. fabaformis
Cytheris
C. bicornis
C. caudata
C. communis
C. costatana
C. dallasensis
C. hannai
C. paraustinensis
C. plummeri
C. spoori
C. verricula
Cytherella
C. austinensis
Cytherelloidea
C. crafti
C. ozanana
C. spiralia
C. tollettensis
Cytheropteron
C. blakei
Haplocytheridea
H. bruceclarki
H. councilli
H. globosa
H. insolita
H. micropunctata
H. plummeri
Krithe
K. cushmani
K. postporjecta
Loxoconcha
L. fletcheri
Monoceratina
M. montuosa
M. pedata
M. prothroensis
Orthonotacythere
O. hannai
Phacorhabdots
P. texanus
Pterygocythere
P. saratogana
Veenia
V. arachoides
V. gapensis
V. ozanana
Velarocythere
V. reesidei

Avians
Hesperornis

Outcrops

See also

 List of fossiliferous stratigraphic units in Arkansas
 Paleontology in Arkansas

References

 

Cretaceous geology of Oklahoma
Cretaceous Arkansas
Cretaceous geology of Texas